The Union Hotel was established by the Murray family in La Porte, California in 1855.  Originally known as the Kitts Union Hotel, it was renamed in 1860 in honor of local Union soldiers.

The original structure was destroyed by fire, and rebuilt in 1906.  The only surviving structural element is the brick safe which stands at the center of the hotel.

See also 
 Claire Cayot O'Rourke
 Plumas National Forest

References

Buildings and structures in Plumas County, California
Hotels in California